2197 Shanghai, provisional designation , is a carbonaceous Themistian asteroid from the outer region of the asteroid belt, approximately 22 kilometers in diameter.

The asteroid was discovered on 30 December 1965, by astronomers at the Purple Mountain Observatory in Nanking, China, and named after the city of Shanghai.

Orbit and classification 

Shanghai is a member of the Themis family, a dynamical family of outer-belt asteroids with nearly coplanar ecliptical orbits. It orbits the Sun at a distance of 2.8–3.6 AU once every 5 years and 7 months (2,047 days). Its orbit has an eccentricity of 0.13 and an inclination of 2° with respect to the ecliptic.

Physical characteristics 

The dark body has been characterized as a C-type asteroid.

Rotation period 

In December 2010, a rotational lightcurve of Shanghai was obtained for this asteroid from photometric observations taken at the U.S. Palomar Transient Factory in California. It gave a rotation period of  hours with a brightness variation of 0.16 magnitude.

One month later in January 2011, a similar period of  hours with an amplitude of 0.16 magnitude was derived by French amateur astronomer Pierre Antonini.

Diameter and albedo 

According to the surveys carried out by the Japanese Akari satellite and NASA's Wide-field Infrared Survey Explorer with its subsequent NEOWISE mission, Shanghai measures 20.2 and 23.9 kilometers in diameter and its surface has an albedo of 0.119 and 0.106, respectively. The Collaborative Asteroid Lightcurve Link derives an albedo of 0.0898 and a diameter of 22.2 kilometers with an absolute magnitude of 11.5.

Naming 

This minor planet is named after Shanghai, the most populous city of China (pop. 24 million as of 2014). Located in the Yangtze River Delta in eastern China, it has the world's busiest container port. The official naming citation was published by the Minor Planet Center on 1 June 1981.

References

External links 
 Asteroid Lightcurve Database (LCDB), query form (info )
 Dictionary of Minor Planet Names, Google books
 Asteroids and comets rotation curves, CdR – Observatoire de Genève, Raoul Behrend
 Discovery Circumstances: Numbered Minor Planets (1)-(5000) – Minor Planet Center
 
 

002197
002197
Named minor planets
19651230